Showbiz is a 2007 Hindi film directed by Raju Khan. It stars Tushar Jalota, Mrinalini Sharma, Gulshan Grover, and Sushant Singh. The music was scored by Lalit Pandit, of Jatin–Lalit fame. The movie revolves around the journey of a budding artist Rohan Arya (Tushar Jalota) trying to make a mark in the Hindi music industry and his brushes with the ups and downs of fame and media which is after him and his personal life.

Khan, the son of veteran choreographer Saroj Khan had a falling out with Mahesh Bhat and walked out of directing the film mid-way. Vishesh Films regular Mohit Suri stepped in to finish filming the remained.

It was the debut movie of Tushar Jalota later on he didn't appear in any movies.

Soundtrack
The music was composed by Lalit Pandit of Jatin–Lalit fame. It consisted of  7 tracks and was released by T-Series on 23 November 2007.

Track listing 
Song name - Performed by - Length
 Tu Mujhse Jab Se Mila Hai - KK - 4:30
 Mere Falak Ka Tu Hi Sitara - KK - 5:42 
 Kash Ek Din Aisa Bhi Aaye - Shaan, Shreya Ghoshal - 4:34
 Duniya Ne Dil Toda - KK - 4:04 
 Tu Mujhse Jab Se Mila Hai (Rap By Earl) - KK - 4:35
  Meri Ibtada - Shreya Ghoshal 1:28 
 Mere falak Ka Tu Hi Sitara (Unplugged) - KK - 4:38

References

External links 

2007 films
2000s Hindi-language films